Scrophularia lanceolata is a species of flowering plant in the figwort family known by the common names lanceleaf figwort and American figwort. It is native to North America, where it is known from western and eastern Canada and much of the United States except for the southeastern quadrant.  Past common names include Western figwort when the western US plants were grouped under the name Scrophularia occidentalis and the eastern US plants were called Scrophularia leporella with the common name hare figwort.

Description and habitat
Scrophularia lanceolata is a perennial herb producing clusters of erect or spreading stems up to 1.5 meters long. The inflorescence is a wide-open panicle with several hairy, glandular branches bearing flowers. The flower has a spherical or urn-shaped corolla opening at the top into a narrow mouth edged with hoodlike lobes. The wide staminode is generally visible in the mouth of the corolla. The ripe fruit is a brown, teardrop-shaped capsule just under a centimeter long, containing many very small black seeds which are released when the capsule splits in half.

It grows part shade to full sun; Scrophularia lanceolata is found in open woods, thickets, along roadsides, and railroad right aways, and in open fields.

The plant has been used medicinally to treat swollen glands.

References

External links
Jepson Manual Treatment
Washington Burke Museum
Photo gallery

lanceolata
Plants described in 1813
Flora of North America